Moon Maid or Moonmaids may refer to:

The Moon Maid, novel by Edgar Rice Burroughs
Moon Maid (comics), character in Dick Tracy comics
Moonmaids (vocal group), American vocal group

See also
Moon Maiden (disambiguation)